Recep Biler (born May 8, 1981 in İzmir, Turkey) is a Turkish goalkeeper. He is 1.93m tall and weighs 80 kg. He is a goalkeeper and transferred from 2000–01 season from Yeni Turgutluspor to Fenerbahçe. He debuted on 29 November 2000 for Siirtspor Turkish Cup 3rd round match.

He played for Turkish National Youth Teams U-18 and U-21.

Honours
 2001 Turkish Super League Champion with Fenerbahçe
 2004 Turkish Super League Champion with Fenerbahçe
 2005 Turkish Super League Champion with Fenerbahçe

External links
 Profile at TFF.org 
 Guardian Stats Centre

1981 births
Living people
Footballers from İzmir
Turkish footballers
Turkey under-21 international footballers
Turkey youth international footballers
Süper Lig players
Fenerbahçe S.K. footballers
Gaziantepspor footballers
Hacettepe S.K. footballers
Manisaspor footballers
Altay S.K. footballers
Balıkesirspor footballers
Association football goalkeepers
TFF First League players